James  Norman Grieve Davidson (born 28 January 1931) is a former Scottish sportsman who represented Scotland in both cricket and rugby union. Davidson played first-class cricket for the Scotland national cricket team in 1951, and represented the Scotland national rugby union team from 1952 to 1954.

Early life

James Davidson was born on 28 January 1931 in Hawick. He attended Hawick High School, and went on to the University of Edinburgh, where he studied medicine.

Cricket career

A right-handed batsman, Davidson made his debut for the Scottish cricket team in May 1951, against Warwickshire (an English county). Later in the year, he also played matches against Northamptonshire, Ireland, and Worcestershire, as well as a two-day game against the touring South Africans. All but the last of those matches held first-class status.

Rugby union career

Amateur career

Davidson played for Edinburgh University RFC when at University of Edinburgh.

Provincial career

He was selected for Edinburgh District and played in the Scottish Inter-District Championship. Playing in the inaugural 1953-54 season he was part of the Edinburgh side that won the title in that year.

International career

Davidson made his international debut on 12 January 1952 at Murrayfield in the Scotland vs France match.
Of the 7 matches he played for his national side he was never on the winning side.
He played his final match for Scotland on 9 January 1954 at Murrayfield in the Scotland vs France match.

References

Sources
 Bath, Richard (ed.) The Scotland Rugby Miscellany (Vision Sports Publishing Ltd, 2007 )
 Massie, Allan A Portrait of Scottish Rugby (Polygon, Edinburgh)

External links

1931 births
Living people
Alumni of Loughborough University
Alumni of the University of Edinburgh
Edinburgh District (rugby union) players
Loughborough Students RUFC players
Rugby union fly-halves
Rugby union players from Hawick
Scotland international rugby union players
Scottish cricketers
Scottish rugby union players